The 1965 Baltimore Colts season was the 13th season for the team in the National Football League. The Baltimore Colts finished the National Football League's 1965 season with a record of 10 wins, 3 losses, and 1 tie, which tied for first in the Western Conference with the Green Bay Packers. No tie-breaking system was in place, and a playoff game was required to determine the Western Conference champion, who would host the Eastern Conference champion Cleveland Browns for the NFL title.

The Colts were victims of the alleged Sports Illustrated cover jinx after linebacker Dennis Gaubatz was featured in late November. According to the article on the team's defense, the 9–1 Colts would soon clinch the Western title. But the team was beset with numerous obstacles from that point on, not the least of which were serious injuries to both of their quarterbacks, future Hall of Famer Johnny Unitas and back-up Gary Cuozzo. 

After it was ruled that veteran free agent Ed Brown had been acquired too late for inclusion on the postseason roster, halfback Tom Matte was pressed into service behind center. Yet the Colts were a remarkably resilient bunch, and if not for a blown call in the playoff game, they would have advanced to the league championship game, which they would have hosted at Memorial Stadium in Baltimore.

Personnel

Staff/coaches

Roster

Regular season

Schedule

Standings

Postseason 
The Western Conference playoff game was played at Lambeau Field in Green Bay the day after Christmas and the Colts led the Packers 10–0 at halftime. The Packers, with back-up quarterback Zeke Bratkowski in for injured Bart Starr, tied it up late in the fourth quarter on Don Chandler's controversial 22-yard field goal. Video replays appeared to show the kicked ball sailed well wide of the right upright -- and the reaction of Chandler confirmed as much. The gaffe resulted in 1) a re-design of the goalposts, and 2) changing the placement of an official directly under each upright on field-goal attempts for the 1966 season. 

Despite evidence to the contrary, the official in question, Jim Tunney (later known as "Dean of NFL Referees"), refused to admit his mistake, claiming that the flight of the ball over the goalpost had been affected by the wind before it veered to the right. The Packers won the game 13–10 in overtime with a 25-yard field goal. The following week the Packers defeated the Cleveland Browns for the NFL title, their third of five under head coach Vince Lombardi and first of three straight.

See also 
History of the Baltimore Colts
Indianapolis Colts seasons
1965 NFL playoffs

References

Baltimore Colts
Baltimore Colts seasons
Baltimore Colts